HMS Berwick was a Rothesay- or Type 12I-class anti-submarine frigate of the British Royal Navy. She was built by Harland & Wolff and launched on 15 December 1959.

Design and construction
The Rothesay class was an improved version of the Whitby-class anti-submarine frigate, with nine Rothesays ordered in the 1954–55 shipbuilding programme for the Royal Navy to supplement the six Whitbys.

The Rothesays were powered by the same Y-100 machinery used by the Whitby-class. Crew was about 212 officers and men.

A twin 4.5-inch (113 mm) Mark 6 gun mount was fitted forward, with 350 rounds of ammunition carried. It was originally intended to fit a twin 40 mm L/70 Bofors anti-aircraft mount aft, but in 1957 it was decided to fit the Seacat anti-aircraft missile instead. Seacat was not yet ready, and Berwick was completed with a single L/60 40 mm Bofors mount aft as a temporary anti-aircraft armament. The design anti-submarine armament consisted of twelve 21-inch torpedo-tubes (eight fixed and two twin rotating mounts) for Mark 20E Bidder homing anti-submarine torpedoes, backed up by two Limbo anti-submarine mortars fitted aft. The Bidder homing torpedoes proved unsuccessful however, being too slow to catch modern submarines, and the torpedo tubes were soon removed.

The ship was fitted with a Type 293Q surface/air search radar on the foremast, with a Type 277 height-finding radar on a short mast forward of the foremast. A Mark 6M fire control system (including a Type 275 radar) for the 4.5 inch guns was mounted above the ship's bridge, while a Type 974 navigation radar was also fitted. The ship's sonar fit consisted of Type 174 search, Type 170 fire control sonar for Limbo and a Type 162 sonar for classifying targets on the sea floor.

Berwick was laid down at Harland & Wolff's Belfast shipyard on 16 June 1958, was launched on 15 December 1959 and completed on 1 June 1961.

Operational service

From 1961 to 1963 Berwick was leader of the 5th Frigate Squadron.

Between 1963 and 1965 Berwick was leader of the 21st Escort Squadron. During the Beira Patrol, she stopped and arrested SS Manuella for attempting to run the oil blockade of Rhodesia (now Zimbabwe) on Easter 1966. Berwick was re-fitted with helicopter landing facilities in 1967.

During the first week in November 1971, Berwick collided with the frigate  in Portsmouth Harbour, whilst leaving for the West Indies. Both ships were ordered to dock for damage assessment, and underwent repairs for minor damage.

From July 1975 to April 1976, she went around the world via the Suez and Panama canals. Other ships in the flotilla included Ajax, Plymouth, Llandaff, Rothesay and Glamorgan. Destinations included Gibraltar, Malta, Egypt (Port Said), India (Madras), Singapore, Hong Kong, Australia (Fremantle, Hobart and Sydney), New Zealand (Nelson and Timaru), Fiji, Samoa, Hawaii, California (San Diego and Long Beach), Panama and finally Curaçao.
  
In 1977, she attended the Silver Jubilee Fleet Review with sisterships Plymouth and Rothesay. At this time she was part of the 8th Frigate Squadron. Industrial action led to plans to fit Berwick with a towed array sonar to be cancelled, and in December 1980 she was paid off into reserve with the standby squadron. By early 1982, Berwick was being considered for disposal as a result of the 1981 Defence White Paper, which proposed cuts in the Royal Navy's surface fleet.

The Argentine invasion of the Falkland Islands in April 1982 changed these plans, as frigates were brought back from standby to active service to take the place of ships that had been sent down to the South Atlantic. Berwick, which was in poor material condition, suffering from serious corrosion and not having undergone any maintenance for many months, was at first used as a source of spare parts to enable sister ship  to return to service. In June that year, work began at Chatham Dockyard to refit Berwick, allowing her to be recommissioned on 5 August 1982, joining the 5th Frigate Squadron. Berwick conducted two successful post war tours with the South Atlantic task forces, in 1982–83. Her final years saw her active on West Indian training cruises, and she was paid off in 1985.

Berwick was sunk as a target ship on 18 August 1986 by a Tigerfish torpedo, which was fired from the submarine Tireless.

Commanding officers

Notes

References

Publications
 
 
 
 
 
 
 

 

Rothesay-class frigates
1959 ships
Ships built by Harland and Wolff
Maritime incidents in 1986